Ryan Christopher Davies (born 5 November 1996) is an English professional cricketer who most recently played for Durham County Cricket Club. He is a right-handed batsman who also plays as a wicket-keeper.

Having joined Sandwich Town Cricket Club, he also played for Kent County Cricket Club from under-13 level onwards. Davies studied at Sandwich Technology School and The Canterbury Academy.

Having played back-up to regular wicket-keeper Sam Billings, Davies made his first-class debut for Kent against Derbyshire in June 2015 after Billings' call-up to the England One Day International side.

At the end of the 2015 season, having been made an offer of regular first-team cricket, Davies signed for Somerset County Cricket Club on a three-year deal.

In December 2015 he was named in England's squad for the 2016 Under-19 Cricket World Cup.

Davies made his maiden first-class half-century during a game against Hampshire on 27 June 2016. Sharing an unbroken stand of 82 with Craig Overton, Davies hit six fours and three sixes on his way to 52 not out off 39 balls.

On 24 July 2016 he made his List A debut against Glamorgan in the 2016 Royal London One-Day Cup.

In September 2017, after two seasons with Somerset, it was announced that Davies was to be leave the county at the end of the season for personal reasons. He joined Durham during 2018, signing a two-eyer contract in May, and played regularly in Twenty20 matches as well as appearing three times during the season in first-class matches. He left the club before the start of the 2019 season, again for personal reasons.

References

External links
 

1996 births
Living people
English cricketers
Kent cricketers
Somerset cricketers
Durham cricketers
People from Thanet (district)
English cricketers of the 21st century
Wicket-keepers